The Sun Advocate was a bi-weekly newspaper located in Price, Utah, United States. It was owned by Brehm Communications of San Diego, California. It was sold to Emery Telcom in October, 2018 and is now published as ETV News Sun Advocate.

The company was the successor to a number of older papers. The Eastern Utah Telegraph published from 1891 to January 1895, and the Eastern Utah Advocate replaced it in February 1895. The Carbon County News began in 1907 and lasted until 1915, when it merged with the Advocate to form the News-Advocate. That same year, the competing Sun began publishing; the two merged in 1932 to form the Sun Advocate. Emery Telcom purchased the Sun Advocate and the Emery County Progress from Brehm Communications in October of 2018. The now weekly newspaper is published and distributed to a total of 14,000 households for free in Carbon and Emery Counties under the name of ETV News.

References

External links 
 

Newspapers published in Utah
Carbon County, Utah